Typhoon (타이푼) was South Korean music group. Typhoon was signed with Trifecta Entertainment (Korea).

Due to Solbi's busy schedule in 2008, she was not able to participate in Typhoon's 3rd album Rendezvous, so therefore another female vocalist replaced her. However, this did not confirm Solbi's departure from the group, she was able to remain a member and work again when she was able to.

In February 2009, Hana officially left the group after only 2 months. Singer Lee Kyung, who sang for the OST of MBC drama Wise Mothers and Good Wives, officially replaced her on February 6.

Typhoon disbanded in 2010.

Line-up

 Woo Jae (우재, vocals) (2006–2010)
 Ji Hwan (지환, rapper) (2006–2010)
 Lee Kyung (이경, vocals) (2009–2010)
 Solbi (솔비, vocals) (2006–2008)
 Hana (하나, vocals) (2008–2009)

Discography

Albums
 Troika, May 2006
 Travel, July 2007
 Rendezvous, November 2008

Awards

Mnet Asian Music Awards

References

 Trifecta Entertainment: Typhoon
 Typhoon in empas people
 Typhoon in YesAsia

K-pop music groups
South Korean idol groups
South Korean hip hop groups
Musical groups established in 2006
Musical groups disestablished in 2010
South Korean co-ed groups